Steve Morabito (born 30 January 1983) is a Swiss former professional road bicycle racer, who competed professionally between 2006 and 2019 for the , ,  and  teams.

Major results

2001
 3rd Road race, National Junior Road Championships
2004
 8th Overall Grand Prix Guillaume Tell
2005
 8th Road race, UCI Under-23 Road World Championships
 8th Giro del Lago Maggiore
2006
 1st Stage 5 Tour de Suisse
 2nd GP Triberg-Schwarzwald
2007
 2nd Overall Herald Sun Tour
1st Stages 4 & 6 (ITT)
 4th GP Miguel Induráin
2008
 7th Overall Circuit de la Sarthe
2010
 4th Overall Tour de Suisse
 7th Overall Circuit de la Sarthe
2011
 2nd Road race, National Road Championships
 5th Overall Giro del Trentino
 9th Overall Tour of California
2012
 2nd Overall Tour of Austria
2014
 1st Stage 1 (TTT) Giro del Trentino
 3rd Road race, National Road Championships
 6th Overall Tour de Suisse
2015
 3rd Time trial, National Road Championships
 8th Overall Tour de Suisse
2016
 3rd Road race, National Road Championships
 9th Overall Tour Down Under
2018
 1st  Road race, National Road Championships
2019
 7th Overall Boucles de la Mayenne

Grand Tour general classification results timeline

References

External links

  
 
 
 
 
 
 
 

1983 births
Living people
Swiss male cyclists
Tour de Suisse stage winners
Sportspeople from Valais
People from Monthey
Cyclists at the 2016 Summer Olympics
Olympic cyclists of Switzerland